The Monash Student Association (Clayton) Inc (MSA) is located at the Clayton campus of Monash University in the Campus Centre building. The MSA is made up of elected student representatives who represent all undergraduate Clayton campus students on general issues such as education, fees and student welfare, and also specific issues such as women's affairs and queer affairs. MSA also operates a Student Theatre, an Activities department, Lot's Wife, Host Scheme, the Short Courses Centre and Wholefoods vegetarian restaurant.

The MSA was formed at the end of 1994 with a merger of the former Monash Association of Students, the Mature Aged and Part Time Students Association and the Monash University International Students Society. It subsequently incorporated as an independent body in 1998.

Services 

Activities

The Activities office organises on-campus student activities and inter-campus competitions and events, such as live bands, DJs, movie nights, and Winter Sabbatical.

Clubs & Societies

Clubs & Societies governs the over 100 (non-sporting) clubs and societies at the Clayton campus. The clubs range from academic-based clubs to those that are cultural, political, spiritual, or relating to a hobby or specific interest.

Education Office
The Education department provides advocacy, policy work, campaign management, advice, and representation to the student body. Some notable achievements include the 2004 HECS protests, the campaign against unfair parking fines, the 2006 campaign for the re-introduction of Swotvac, and some success in the continuing push for online recording of lectures.

Environment Department

The Environment Department facilitates student involvement in sustainability and social justice, both on campus and in the wider community. They work with the university in order in minimising consumption of water, paper and energy; purchasing and use of renewable energies, recycled paper and other eco-friendly products; minimising waste and maintaining effective recycling and composting programs. They support wider student campaigns on issues like protection of old-growth forests, fair trade, indigenous justice, refugee rights, and climate change.

Radio Monash

Radio Monash is a radio station, which offers live webstreaming and podcasting and offers training in aspects of broadcasting in a full digital recording studio, which is often used as a rehearsal room for bands and musicians. Whilst not directly funded by or affiliated with the MSA, Radio Monash still works in conjunction with the MSA during their music events.

Host Scheme

Host Scheme is an orientation program that runs a camps program, functions program and Host Scheme Night; a huge party at the start of Orientation Week, which attracts thousands of new students.

Recreational Library ("Surly")

The Student Union Recreational Library (formerly John Medley Library) is the only recreational library at Monash University's Clayton Campus. It provides houses a wide range of fiction and non-fiction books, comics, magazines, DVDs, CDs and vinyl records.

Lot's Wife

Lot's Wife is the student newspaper. It addresses student issues and news, provides a voice for student commentary and reviews.

Queer Department

The MSA Queer Department caters for all students who identify as lesbian, gay, bisexual, transgender, intersex or those who are questioning their sexuality and/or gender identity. It provides the queer lounge, as a safe a queer-only space where students can gather, socialise and discuss queer issues in a supportive environment, and also works to collectively fight against discrimination and oppression suffered by queers in society.

Student Theatre

The Student Theatre (MUST) is a place for students to get involved in acting, directing or backstage work, and stages a large number of productions a year.

Welfare

The Welfare department runs Free Food Mondays, giving struggling students free vegetarian food every Monday night. It recycles old donated computers by rebuilding them for students. It also runs the Survival Centre, which contains free food and second-hand clothing for students in need.

Women's Room

The Women's Room is a women-only environment, a place for women to socialise, study and meet other women. It was created by the student union due to perceived university in-action over a rising spate of assaults around campus, particularly after normal class hours, on women.

Wholefoods

Wholefoods is a vegetarian restaurant, cafe and grocery service owned and run mostly on a volunteer basis by students.

Footnotes

References

External links
 Monash Student Association (Clayton)
 Clubs & Societies
 Radio Monash
"Uni blues" by Shane Green, The Age, 22 March 2004, retrieved 14 June 2006.
"Poverty-stricken students reliant on food handouts" by Shane Green, The Age, 22 March 2004, retrieved 14 June 2006.
"Students on warpath over HECS hike" by David Rood, The Age, 23 March 2004, retrieved 14 June 2006.
"Monash fee backlash as board member quits" by David Rood, The Age, 24 March 2004, retrieved 14 June 2006.
"Students, police injured in Monash University fees protest" by Bridie Smith, The Age, 26 March 2004, retrieved 14 June 2006.
"Free market goes to uni" by Shane Green and David Rood, The Age, 27 March 2004, retrieved 14 June 2006.
"Student group slams university pokie plan", ABC Melbourne, 21 March 2005, retrieved 14 June 2006.
"Mild in the streets" by Janet De Silva, The Age, 25 April 2005, retrieved 14 June 2006.

Students' unions in Australia
Monash University